Guam Highway 6 (GH-6) is one of the primary automobile highways in the United States territory of Guam. It is known as Spruance Drive within Piti and Halsey Drive within Asan-Maina: both named for noteworthy US Navy Admirals that served in the Pacific Ocean theater of World War II: Raymond A. Spruance and William Halsey Jr., respectively.

Route description
The route creates a diversion along part of GH-1 into the highlands of Piti and Asan-Maina and is the primary means of reaching Nimitz Hill and Nimitz Hill Annex. Both termini are with GH-1, and the only other major junction is with the terminus of GH-7 near the eastern end, providing access to Naval Hospital Guam on Agana Heights.

Major intersections

References

006